Unionville is an unincorporated community in Benton Township, Monroe County, in the U.S. state of Indiana.

History
Unionville was originally known as Fleenersburg, and under the latter name was platted in 1847. The post office at Unionville has been in operation since 1848.

In 1911, Unionville was the precise center of the United States population. A monument was dedicated there at that time.

Geography

Education
Unionville is home to an elementary school, Unionville Elementary School, which was once Unionville High School.

References

Further reading

Unincorporated communities in Monroe County, Indiana
Unincorporated communities in Indiana
Bloomington metropolitan area, Indiana